Sindicato de Medicos de Asistencia Publica v Conselleria de Sanidad y Consumo de la Generalidad Valenciana (2000) C-303/98 is a European labour law case concerning the Working Time Directive, which is relevant for the Working Time Regulations 1998.

Facts
The Spanish legislation that implemented the Working Time Directive applied only to private sector workers. The question was if Spanish doctors in the Sindicato de Médicos de Asistencia Pública were engaged in public sector work described as in regulation 18(2)(a) (now updated through Article 17), which gave examples of the armed forces and police.

Judgment
The European Court of Justice held that health care workers could not be ‘assimilated to such activities’ to fall within the exception for essential public sector workers like the armed forces. According to the general principles of construction, ‘it is clear both from the object of the basic Directive, namely to encourage improvement in the safety and health of workers at work, and from the wording of Article 2(1) thereof, that it must necessarily be broad in scope. It follows that the exceptions to the scope of the basic Directive, including that provided for in Article [1(3)] must be interpreted restrictively.’ This meant that time doctors spent ‘on call’ where they were ‘obliged to respond to requests for home visits and urgent requests’ was working time and so time going over the 48-hour ceiling violated the Directive.

See also

UK labour law
Working Time Directive

Notes

Spanish case law
Court of Justice of the European Union case law
2000 in case law
2000 in Spain
European Union labour case law